Megan McKenzie (born 1 January 1980) is a South African model. She has been voted South Africa's sexiest woman by readers of FHM in 2003, ranking behind only Halle Berry.

She is the sister of South African international cricketer Neil McKenzie.

References

South African female models
South African people of British descent
White South African people
Living people
1980 births